Ever since the 2009 election resulted in Erik Fabrin from Venstre becoming mayor, Venstre had held the mayor's position in the Municipality. It was Jens Ive who had become mayor following the 2017 election

In this election, the Conservatives would surprisingly become the biggest party. They won 9 seats, an increase of 4, while Venstre won 5 seats, 3 less than in 2017. The Conservatives would eventually find an agreement with Lokalisten and Danish Social Liberal Party, which would see Ann Sofie Orth becoming the first mayor in the municipality from the Conservatives.  Eventually, all parties would agree on the constitution.

Electoral system
For elections to Danish municipalities, a number varying from 9 to 31 are chosen to be elected to the municipal council. The seats are then allocated using the D'Hondt method and a closed list proportional representation.
Rudersdal Municipality had 23 seats in 2021

Unlike in Danish General Elections, in elections to municipal councils, electoral alliances are allowed.

Electoral alliances  

Electoral Alliance 1

Electoral Alliance 2

Electoral Alliance 3

Results

Notes

References 

Rudersdal
Politics of Denmark